Seven Bucks Productions is a production company involved with various platforms and mediums, credited with creating original releases for television, film, emerging technologies, and digital networks. The studio was co-created and founded by Dwayne "The Rock" Johnson and Dany Garcia. The company predominantly produces a variety of projects, directly in relation with Johnson's film slate, these films have grossed $4.6 billion at box office. 

The name Seven Bucks Productions referenced the amount of cash Johnson had in his pocket after he was released from the Canadian Football League in 1995 and before he signed with the World Wrestling Federation (WWF, now WWE).

Hiram Garcia has served as President of the company overseeing production on each of the studio's projects since 2017. That same year, Chelsea Friedland was hired as Vice President of Production. In March 2019, Kevin Hill was named as Head of Television and Digital Development.

Business organization

 Dwayne "The Rock" Johnson: CEO, co-founder and co-owner (2012–present)
 Dany Garcia: Co-founder and co-owner (2012–present)
 Hiram Garcia: President of Production (2017–present); former-studio executive (2012–2017)
 Chelsea Friedland: Vice President of Production (2017–present)
 Kevin Hill: Head of Television and Digital Development (2018–present)
 Maya Lasry: Chief Marketing Officer (2019–present)
 Kimberly Bialek: Executive Vice President of Development and Production (2020–present)

List of releases

Film

Short films

Television

Podcast

References

Notes 

Film production companies of the United States
Television production companies of the United States
American companies established in 2012
Mass media companies established in 2012
Dwayne Johnson